Rose & Frank Co v JR Crompton & Bros Ltd [1924] is a leading decision on English contract law, regarding the intention to create legal relations in commercial arrangements. In the Court of Appeal, Atkin LJ delivered an important dissenting judgment which was upheld by the House of Lords.

The case also is an example of the application of the Blue Pencil Rule.

Facts
Rose and Frank Co was the sole US distributor of JR Crompton's carbon paper products.  In 1913, the parties signed a new document which included this clause:

The relationship between the two parties broke down as JR Crompton refused to supply some of the orders of the plaintiff. Rose & Frank Co sued on enforcement of the agreement.

Judgment
At first instance, the court held that the honourable pledge was repugnant to the intention of the rest of the document, and that furthermore the enforceability of such a clause was contrary to public policy. In his decision, Bailhache J. reasoned that the impugned clause was of no effect and that the document was a legally binding contract and enforceable in the court.

Court of Appeal

Scrutton LJ stated that parties are capable of forming an agreement that does not give rise to legal relations. "The reason of this is that the parties do not intend that their agreement shall give rise to legal relations. This intention may be implied from the subject matter of the agreement, but it may also be expressed by the parties. In social and family relations such an intention is readily implied, while in business matters the opposite result would ordinarily follow."

Atkin LJ agreed that there was no contract, but dissented on the order. He delivered the following judgment:

House of Lords
Lord Phillimore for the House of Lords, held that the arrangement of 1913 was not a legally binding contract. At the date of the arrangement of 1913, all previous agreements were determined by mutual consent, but the orders given and accepted constituted enforceable contracts of sale.

See also
Baird Textile Holdings Ltd v Marks & Spencer plc [2001] EWCA Civ 274

Notes

External links
 Full text of decision from Bailii.org

English enforceability case law
House of Lords cases
1924 in case law
1924 in British law
Stationery